Patrick C. Perroud (born December 31, 1962) is a Canadian curler, a two-time  and a two-time  champion.

He is one of the few curlers to win world titles with different skips: in 1985 with Al Hackner and in 1990 with Ed Werenich.

Personal life
Perroud is married to Canadian and World curling champion Jane Hooper-Perroud. Originally from Thunder Bay, Perroud moved to Toronto after graduating from Lakehead University.

He started curling in 1973 when he was 11 years old.

Awards
Canadian Curling Hall of Fame: 1999

Teams

References

External links
 
 Pat Perroud – Curling Canada Stats Archive
 1993 Ice Hot International #21 Pat Perroud | The Trading Card Database
 Video:  (full game)

1962 births
Living people
Brier champions
Canadian male curlers
Curlers from Thunder Bay
Curlers from Toronto
World curling champions
Lakehead University alumni
20th-century Canadian people